Vincent Labonté (born April 8, 1987) is a Mauritian football player who currently plays for Curepipe Starlight SC in the Mauritian Premier League and for the Mauritius national football team as a defender.

References 

1987 births
Living people
Mauritius international footballers
Mauritian footballers
Mauritian Premier League players
Curepipe Starlight SC players
Association football defenders